Verbal abuse is a form of abusive behavior involving the use of language.

Verbal abuse may also refer to:

 Verbal Abuse (band), a hardcore punk rock band
 "Verbal Abuse", a song by The Undead

See also
 Verbal aggressiveness, a personality trait or a mainly destructive form of communication